George Pinto may refer to:

George Pinto (composer) (1785-1806), English composer.
George Pinto (banker) (1929-2018)